Tord Filipsson (born 7 May 1950) is a Swedish former road cyclist. He finished sixth-seventh with the Swedish team at the 1972 and 1976 Summer Olympics. At the world championships he won a bronze medal in 1973 and a gold in 1974, both in the team time trial. Domestically he held the individual time trial title in 1972 and 1974–77.

He competed in the Tour of Britain in 1971, 1972, 1974 and 1975 and won one stage in 1971 and 1972. Overall his best result was third place in 1974 and 1975.

His younger sister Sylvia Filipsson is a former Olympics speed skater.

References

External links
 

1950 births
Living people
Swedish male cyclists
Olympic cyclists of Sweden
Cyclists at the 1972 Summer Olympics
Cyclists at the 1976 Summer Olympics
People from Södermanland
UCI Road World Champions (elite men)
20th-century Swedish people
21st-century Swedish people